Sääre is a village in Saaremaa Parish, Saare County, Estonia, on the island of Saaremaa. It is located on the southern top of the Sõrve Peninsula. As of 2011 Census, the settlement is uninhabited.

Sääre village is the location of Sõrve Lighthouse and former Red Army's Coastal Battery nr 315 (known as Stebel Battery) during World War II.

References

Villages in Saare County
Former villages